The Government-General of Taiwan (Government of Taiwan, Taiwan Government, Government of Formosa, Japanese: , Kyūjitai: , Hepburn: Taiwan Sōtoku-fu; ; Tâi-lô: Tâi-uân Tsóng-tok-hú; Pha̍k-fa-sṳ=Thòi-vân Chúng-tuk-fú) was the government that governed Taiwan under Japanese rule between 1895 and 1945.

History 
The Government-General of Taiwan was founded on May 10, 1895, two days after the Treaty of Shimonoseki was enforced. It started to rule Taiwan since June 17, 1895 after the Japanese forces took over Taiwan. On August 15, 1945, with the surrender of Japan, the organizations of Government-General was transformed to the newly established Taiwan Provincial Government and Taiwan Garrison Command. The transformation was completed on February 20, 1946.

Organization and structure

Governor-General 

The Governor-General of Taiwan (Japanese: , Hepburn: Taiwan Sōtoku, Pe̍h-ōe-jī: Tâi-oân Chóng-tok) was the ruler of Taiwan in the Japanese era. The Governor-General was supervised by the Prime Minister of Japan, and then by the Minister of Home Affairs and the Minister of Colonial Affairs. The Governor-General exercised executive, legislative, and judicial powers in Taiwan. The Governor-General was also the commander of the Mixed Brigade of Taiwan Defense until it reorganized to the Taiwan Army under the Imperial Japanese Army in 1919

Chief of General Affairs 
The Chief of General Affairs (Japanese: , Hepburn: Sōmu Chōkan, Pe̍h-ōe-jī: Chóng-bū Tiúⁿ-koaⁿ), named Chief of Civil Affairs (Japanese: , Hepburn: Minsei Chōkan, Pe̍h-ōe-jī: Bîn-chèng Tiúⁿ-koaⁿ) before 1919, was the primary executor of the policy in Taiwan, and the second most powerful official after the Governor-General.

Internal Departments 
In 1895, the Government-General was founded with three departments: Department of Civil Affairs, Department of Army, Department of Navy. The military departments are to prepare the warfare with the rebellions in Taiwan. The Departments of Army and Navy were soon been merged into Department of Military Affairs in 1896. With the Civil-Military divide in the 1910s, the Department of Military Affairs were reorganized as the Taiwan Army Command under Imperial Japanese Army. All bureaus under the Department of Civil Affairs became independents departments under the Government-General, and the Chief of Civil Affairs (then Chief of General Affairs) became a role similar to a head of Government.

At the end of Japanese rule, the Government-General has the following organs.

External Departments 
There is a large number of external departments of the Government-General. Notable departments are
 Courts
 Taiwan High Court and 5 District Courts (Taihoku, Shinchiku, Taichū, Tainan, Takao)
 Taiwan High Prosecutors Office and 5 prosecutors offices in the district courts
 Department of Transportation
 Railway Bureau
 Communications Bureau (for postal and telecommunications)
 Monopoly Bureau (for opium, salt, camphor, liquor and tobacco)
 Port Bureau
 Takao Port Authority
 Kīrun Port Authority
 Higher Education
 Taihoku Imperial University
 Taihoku College of Commerce
 Taihoku College of Technology
 Taihoku College
 Taichū College of Agriculture
 Tainan College of Technology
 Imperial Taiwan Library
 Governmental Hospital
 Shintō shrines
 Taiwan Grand Shrine

Local government 

In 1945, Taiwan was divided to 8 prefectures. They are: Taihoku Prefecture, Shinchiku Prefecture, Taichū Prefecture, Tainan Prefecture, Takao Prefecture, Karenkō Prefecture, Taitō Prefecture, and Hōko Prefecture. The prefectures are further divided into 11 cities, 52 districts, and 2 subprefectures.

Governmental buildings 

After the Treaty of Shimonoseki was enforced from May 8, 1895, the Empire of Japan started to rule Taiwan. In the early years, the Government-General was seated in the former Fukien-Taiwan Provincial Administration Hall build by the Qing Empire in 1892.

The new governmental building was planned in 1907 by the 5th Governor-General Sakuma Samata. Construction began on June 1, 1912 and was completed on March 31, 1919 at a cost of 2.8 million Japanese yen. The new building of the Government-General, now named Presidential Office Building, is still being used as the office of the President of the Republic of China after World War II.

The residence of the Governor-General of Taiwan is known today as Taipei Guest House.

See also 
 History of Taiwan
 Timeline of Taiwanese history
 Political divisions of Taiwan (1895–1945)

References

External links 
 Documents of the Government-General of Taiwan
 Glossary of Asian History Government-General of Taiwan
 Formosa (Taiwan) Under Japanese Rule

Taiwan under Japanese rule